Sambhaji III (1801 - 2 July 1821) was Raja of Kolhapur of the Bhonsle dynasty. He ruled from 24 April 1813 to 2 July 1821.

Sources

Maharajas of Kolhapur
1801 births
1821 deaths